Odites balsamias is a moth in the family Depressariidae. It was described by Edward Meyrick in 1911. It is found in South Africa.

The wingspan is about 17 mm. The forewings are yellow whitish, the veins faintly yellower and the costal edge pale fulvous ochreous. The hindwings are pale whitish ochreous tinged with grey.

References

Endemic moths of South Africa
Moths described in 1911
Odites
Taxa named by Edward Meyrick